The Roman Catholic Archdiocese of La Paz is an archdiocese located in the city of La Paz in Bolivia.

History
 July 4, 1605: Established as Diocese of La Paz in Bolivia from the Diocese of La Plata
 June 18, 1943: Promoted as Metropolitan Archdiocese of La Paz

Special churches
Minor Basilicas:
 Basílica de la Virgen de la Candelaria, Copacabana
 Basílica de San Francisco, La Paz 
 Basílica María Auxiliadora, La Paz

Bishops of the diocese

Diocese of La Paz
Erected: 4 July 1605
Diego de Zambrana (de Carmona) (4 Jul 1605 – 14 Jan 1608 Appointed, Archbishop of La Plata o Charcas before he arrived in La Paz).
Domingo Valderrama y Centeno, O.P. (28 May 1608 – 1615 Died)
Pedro de Valencia (30 Jul 1617 – 1631 Died); Archbishop (personal title)
Feliciano de la Vega Padilla (5 Sep 1633 – 13 Sep 1638 Appointed, Archbishop of México)
Alfonso de Franco y Luna (30 May 1639 – 1645 Died)
Francisco de la Serna, O.E.S.A. (21 Aug 1645 – Apr 1647 Died)
Luis Antonio de Castro y Castillo (13 Jan 1648 – 7 Oct 1653 Died)
Martín Velasco y Molina (14 May 1655 – 1662 Died)
Martín de Montalvo Calderon de la Barca, O.S.A. (21 Jul 1664 – Dec 1668 Died)
Gabriel de Guilléstegui, O.F.M. (1 Sep 1670 – 1677 Died)
Juan Pérez de Corcha (22 Jan 1680 Appointed – )
Juan Queipo de Llano y Valdés (23 Sep 1680 – 19 Apr 1694 Appointed, Archbishop of La Plata o Charcas)
Bernardo de Carrasco y Saavedra,  O.P. (19 Jul 1694 – 24 Aug 1697 Died)
Nicolás Urbán de Mota y Haro (12 May 1702 – 25 Dec 1704 Died)
Diego Morcillo Rubio de Suñón de Robledo, O.SS.T. (14 May 1708 – 21 Mar 1714 Appointed, Archbishop of La Plata o Charcas)
Mateo Panduro y Villafaña, O.C.D. (1 Oct 1714 – 21 Mar 1722 Died)
Alejo Fernando de Rojas y Acevedo (30 Aug 1723 – 1730 Died)
Agustín Rodríguez Delgado (17 Dec 1731 – 22 Jan 1742 Confirmed, Archbishop of La Plata o Charcas)
Salvador Bermúdez y Becerra (28 Feb 1742 – 14 Jun 1746 Confirmed, Archbishop of La Plata o Charcas)
José de Peralta Barrionuevo y Rocha Benavídez,  O.P. (14 Jun 1746 – 17 Nov 1746 Died)
Matías Ibáñez de Segovia (4 Sep 1747 – 25 Aug 1751 Died)
Diego Antonio de Parada (18 Dec 1752 – 25 Jan 1762 Appointed, Archbishop of Lima)
Gregorio Francisco de Campos (4 May 1764 – 22 Dec 1789 Died)
Alejandro José de Ochoa y Morillo (11 Apr 1791 – 1796 Died)
Remigio de La Santa y Ortega (24 Jul 1797 – 10 Aug 1816 Resigned)
Antonio Sánchez Matas, O.F.M. (21 Dec 1818 – 28 Apr 1827 Resigned)
José María Mendizábal (15 Dec 1828 – 24 Jul 1835 Appointed, Archbishop of La Plata o Charcas)
Francisco de Paula León de Aguirre Velasco (19 May 1837 – 13 Jul 1840 Resigned)
José Manuel Fernández de Córdoba y Meló (13 Jul 1840 – 4 Mar 1841 Died)
José Manuel Gregorio Indaburu (Yndaburu) (22 Jun 1843 – 16 Dec 1844 Died)
Michael Orozco (20 Jan 1848 – 1849 Died)
Mariano Fernández de Córdoba (10 Apr 1851 – 2 May 1868 Died)
Calixto Maria Clavijo Salazar (24 Sep 1868 – 27 Apr 1874 Resigned)
Juan de Dios Bosque (4 May 1874 – 9 March 1890 Died)
Juan José Baldivia Morales (1 Jun 1891 – 5 Oct 1899 Died)
Nicolás Armentia Ugarte, O.F.M. (12 Nov 1901 – 24 Nov 1909 Died)
Manuel José Peña (30 Nov 1911 – 10 Aug 1914 Died)
Dionisio Avila (27 Jan 1916 – 30 Jun 1919 Died)
Celestino Loza (20 Jun 1920 – 18 Jan 1921 Died)
Auguste Sieffert, C.SS.R. (15 Nov 1924 – 24 Feb 1934 Resigned)
Abel Isidoro Antezana y Rojas, C.M.F. (16 Jan 1938 – 5 Apr 1967 Retired)

Archdiocese of La Paz
Elevated: 18 June 1943
Jorge Manrique Hurtado (27 Jul 1967 – 24 Feb 1987 Retired)
Luis Sáinz Hinojosa, O.F.M. (24 Feb 1987 – 31 Jul 1996 Resigned)
Edmundo Luis Flavio Abastoflor Montero (31 Jul 1996 – 23 May 2020 Retired)
Percy Lorenzo Galván Flores (23 May 2020 – present)

Coadjutor archbishop
Alejandro Mestre Descals, S.J. (1982.06.28 - 1987.02.24), did not succeed to see

Auxiliary Bishops of La Paz
José Clemente Maurer C.Ss.R., (1950.03.01 – 1951.10.27), appointed Archbishop of Sucre (Cardinal in 1967)
Jorge Manrique Hurtado (1952.02.23 - 1956.07.28), appointed Bishop of Oruro (later returned here as Archbishop)
José Armando Gutiérrez Granier (1956 - 1965.08.19), appointed Archbishop of Cochabamba
Gennaro Maria Prata Vuolo, S.D.B. (1960.12.09 - 1981.11.21), appointed Archbishop of Cochabamba
Adhemar Esquivel Kohenque (1968.11.11 - 1992.11.10), appointed Coadjutor Bishop of Tarija
Andrea Bernardo Schierhoff (1969.01.02 – 1982.12.17), appointed Prelate of Pando
Julio Terrazas Sandoval, C.SS.R. (1978.04.15 - 1982.01.09), appointed Bishop of Oruro; future Cardinal
Gonzalo Ramiro del Castillo Crespo, O.C.D. (1983.11.03 - 2000.04.14), appointed Bishop of Bolivia, Military
Luis Morgan Casey (1983.12.03 – 1988.01.18), appointed Vicar Apostolic of Pando
Nino Marzoli, C. R. (1988.04.16 - 1992.04.28), appointed Auxiliary Bishop of Santa Cruz de la Sierra
Oscar Omar Aparicio Céspedes (2002.05.29 - 2012.04.04), appointed Bishop of Bolivia, Military
Aurelio Pesoa Ribera, O.F.M. (2014.03.25 - 2020.11.28), appointed Vicar Apostolic of El Beni
Jorge Ángel Saldías Pedraza, O.P. (2014.03.25 - 2019.10.11), appointed Bishop of Tarija
Mario Luis Durán Berríos (2022.02.22-)
Pedro Luis Fuentes Valencia (2022.02.22-)
Basilio Mamani Quispe (2022.02.22-)

Suffragan dioceses
Diocese of Coroico
Diocese of El Alto
Territorial Prelature of Corocoro

See also
Roman Catholicism in Bolivia

References

External links
 GCatholic.org
 Diocese website

Roman Catholic dioceses in Bolivia
Religious organizations established in the 1600s
La Paz
Roman Catholic dioceses and prelatures established in the 17th century
La Paz Department (Bolivia)
 
Roman Catholic ecclesiastical provinces in Bolivia
1605 establishments in the Spanish Empire